Scarborough International Rugby League Festival is a rugby league nines tournament that is held in Scarborough, North Yorkshire, England. The 2008 festival was played at George Pindar School on Saturday 26 April 2008 and Sunday 27 April 2008.

The festival is a joint initiative from Breakaway Sports Tours, the RFL, Scarborough Pirates ARLFC and Scarborough Council and is aimed at teams from under-8 to under-13s.

In 2007, 33 teams involving 450 players played 107 matches with 1,500 people attending over the two days.

See also

References

External links
Scarborough Rugby League Festival on breakawaytours.co.uk

School sport in the United Kingdom
Sport in Scarborough, North Yorkshire
Rugby league nines competitions in the United Kingdom